Saraycık is a village in the Gerger District, Adıyaman Province, Turkey. The village is populated by Kurds of the Dirêjan tribe and had a population of 150 in 2021.

The hamlet of Başak is attached to Saraycık.

References

Villages in Gerger District
Kurdish settlements in Adıyaman Province